Yasuko I. Takezawa  is a Japanese cultural anthropologist who researches race, ethnicity, and immigration in the United States, Japan, and other countries. She is a professor of cultural anthropology and sociology at the Institute for Research in the Humanities of Kyoto University.

Career 
Takezawa is a professor cultural anthropology and sociology at Kyoto University. She specializes in the study of race, ethnicity, and immigration, particularly in the United States and Japan. A distinguishing concern of Takezawa’s research is that race is not a modern Western construction but a construction emanating from the Middle Ages at least in Europe and Japan.

She is the author of Breaking the Silence: Ethnicity and Redress among Japanese Americans (1995) which was one of the finalists of Victor Turner Prize of the American Anthropological Association. Its Japanese version, 新装版 日系アメリカ人のエスニシティ (Transformation of Japanese American Ethnicity; 1994), won the Shibusawa Award of the Japanese Ethnological Society (now the Japanese Association of Cultural Anthropology).

Selected works

Books

As author 

 新装版 日系アメリカ人のエスニシティ (1994) 
Breaking the Silence: Ethnicity and Redress among Japanese Americans (1995)

As editor 

 Racial Representations in Asia (2011) 
Trans-Pacific Japanese American Studies: Conversations on Race and Racializations (2016; co-edited with Gary Y. Okihiro) 
Kantaiheiyō chiiki no idō to jinshu : tōchi kara kanri e sōgū kara rentai e (Migration and Race in the Trans-Pacific Region) (2019; co-edited with Akio Tanabe and Ryuichi Narita) 
Hyokka Ryoran: Hyogo Tabunkakyōsei no 150 nen no Ayumi. (A History of 150 Years Old Multicultural Coexistence in Hyogo Prefecture) (2021; co-edited with Daisuke Higuchi, and Hyoto International Association)

Articles

References

External links 

Integrated Research into the Processes and Mechanisms of Racialization
Yasuko Takezawa, Institute of Research in Humanities Kyoto University

1957 births
Living people
Japanese anthropologists
Japanese women anthropologists
Academic staff of Kyoto University